Kelham is a surname. Notable people with the surname include:

 George W. Kelham (1871–1936), American architect
 James Kelham (1796–1882), New Zealand businessman and politician
 Robert Kelham (1717–1808), English attorney and legal antiquary
 Christopher Kelham, British film actor and producer